Manghopir Hills are located in between Karachi West District of Sindh and Hub District of Balochistan in Pakistan.

The hills in Karachi are the offshoots of the Kirthar Range. The highest point of these hills in Karachi is about 528m in the extreme north. All these hills are devoid of vegetation and have wide intervening plains, dry river beds and water channels.

See also
 Mulri Hills
 Khasa Hills
 Kirthar Mountains

References

Hills of Karachi
Hills of Sindh